Tenali Rama is an Indian Hindi-language historical comedy drama based on the life of the legendary Telugu poet Tenali Ramakrishna, one of the Ashtadiggajas (or the eight honorable poets) at the court of Vijayanagara emperor Krishnadevaraya (C.E. 1509–1529), who is often cited as the greatest Vijayanagara emperor. The series premiered on Sony SAB on 11 July 2017 and went off-air on 13 November 2020.

The series was produced by Abhimanyu Singh under the banner of Contiloe Entertainment. The story took a 9-month leap in 2018 followed by a 6-year leap in August 2019 followed again by a 20-year leap and a 4-month leap in February 2020. The series' filming was halted for 4 months (from March to July) due to COVID-19 pandemic and the series was finally completed on 13 November 2020. This show was replaced by another Contiloe Entertainment show, Kaatelal & Sons.

Plot
Rama Krishna is a poor Brahmin who lived in a village called Tenali. The scene begins with the preparations of Rama's marriage with Sharada. Rama is found to be absconding from his own marriage and is later found to be dozing under a tree. Gundappa, his closest friend comes to wake him up and take him to his marriage. Rama, though he loves Sharada, is not of the opinion to get married immediately to her. One day, he comes across Tathacharya, the royal priest of Vijayanagar. After a series of events, Tathacharya believes that Rama has insulted him. He challenges Rama to enter the city of Vijayanagar. Soon, Gundappa's father faces crisis due to his land not being ploughed, Rama tricked the villagers into believing that the field contains a treasure full of gold coins within it. And overnight, the entire population of Tenali dig up Gundappa's father's field. Hence, Rama is successful in getting the field dug up and ready for seed planting. By seeing his wit, wisdom, humor, intelligence and cleverness, a Sadhu tells him to go to the nearby temple of Kaali Mata and chant her name a thousand times so that he can be successful in life. As soon as Rama gets Kaali Mata's blessings, he marries Sharada and leaves for Vijayanagar.

Over the years, he saves Vijayanagar from various dangerous opponents  by using his wit, wisdom, humor, intelligence and cleverness, he becomes legendary Royal Advisor and one of the famous Ashtadiggajas Pandit Ramakrishna in Krishnadevaraya's court.

Legendary poet and royal advisor Pandit Ramakrishna in Krishnadevaraya's court uses his timely wit and intelligence to solve even the trickiest problems. His arch-rival Tathacharya (the royal priest), who wants to humiliate him, is often stumped by Ramakrishna's intelligence. Rama is very close to the King, Krishnadevaraya, often behaving and caring for each other like best friends. 
Soon, Sharda, Rama's wife is pregnant with their son, Bhaskar. Bhaskar is shown to have been an active part of Rama's clever ploys eve while being a baby who could just cry.
Six years later, Bhaskar, Ramakrishna's son, is a naughty child and causes his father to be humiliated in the court of Krishnadevaraya multiple times, to which Rama starts punishing Bhaskar for his naughtiness. He stops spoiling Bhaskar like he used to. Later, Bhaskar stops being naughty. Then, Prince Balakumara arrives. Balakumara is Krishnadevaraya second wife, Tirumalamba's, brother. Balakumara is a spoiled prince who cares a lot about his hair. Bhaskar is in Tathacharya's home to get Tathacharya to forgive him on his father's orders. Bhaskara has to glue together a broken vase. Balakumara, who is at Tathacharya's home to learn from him, puts on the broken vase as a crown. The vase has glue on it, which causes it to be stuck to Balakumara's hair. Balakumara's hair must be pulled off his head to remove the vase. Balakumara never gets his hair back and is forever angry at Bhaskar, who is blamed for Balakumara's mistake. Bhaskar is then sent to Gurukul (school) for 20 years.

Three months later, Krishnadevaraya and Ramakrishna have a debate about whether the golden era of Vijayanagar would end. This is foreshadowing the future.

Twenty years later, Bhaskar returns from Gurukul. He finds from the reformed Tathacharya that Balakumara was crowned king after King Krishnadevaraya left the kingdom for an unknown reason as there was no one else from the royal lineage to be crowned the monarch. Kaikala, Balakumara's uncle and Mahamatya, is the new main antagonist. Bhaskar's family is gone, and Bhaskar tries to find them. He eventually identifies Mooshak, the leader of a bandit group to be his mother, Sharda. On one of his attempts to interact with Amrapali, Mahamatya Kaikala's daughter, he eavesdrops on Kaikala revealing that he had kidnapped and imprisoned Maharaja Krishnadevaraya and Pandit Ramakrishna for twenty years. Kaikala soon received news that Pandit Ramakrishna had fleed from prison after befooling the guards during a thunderstorm. Bhaskar is astounded to know all this. He then pretends to be his father, Pandit Rama Krishna, to give justice to people in Vijayanagar. He gives back Tathacharya his position, which he had lost for many years, which causes Tathacharya to become evil again. Eventually, Kaikala is caught trying to kill Balakumar, which causes the former to be put in jail for life. Balakumara's wife and Kaikala's assistant, Sulakshana Devi is the new main antagonist. She eventually gets Balakumara banished from Vijayanagara. She assumes the role of a ruler.

Four months later, Ramakrishna returns to the position he had before. He stops Sulakshana Devi from being crowned the Empress of Vijayanagara and instead makes it so that in 4 years, Sulakshana Devi's adopted son, Swami, will be crowned emperor of Vijayanagara. Sulakshana Devi, the new Minister Pralayankar (Kaikala's son), Sulakshana Devi's brother Bharkam, and Sulakshana Devi's sister Charulata try to beat Ramakrishna. Krishnadevaray returns with his two queens and punishes Sulakshana Devi by ordering her to find her husband Balakumara who was banished from the kingdom.

Many people come to get rid of Ramakrishna but he stays put and saves Vijayanagar from various enemies. At last, Ramakrishna realises that the youth in Tenali are going out to achieve their jobs, leaving their native village Tenali, undeveloped. Ramakrishna immediately gets ready to leave back to Tenali, his native village, forsaking Vijayanagara kingdom to help the youth in Tenali and its development. Since then, the people gave him the name "Tenali RamaKrishna" (as a representation of his love towards his native village).

Cast

Main

Krishna Bharadwaj as 
Tenali Ramakrishna / Pandit Ramakrishna: A legendary poet, Chief advisor and Ashtadiggaja in Krishnadevraya's court. He is exceptionally intelligent, witty, loyal, dutiful, important and famous courtier and always solves the problems of Vijayanagar and the king. Lakshmi Amma's son; Sharada's husband, Bhaskar's father; Gundappa's friend and Krishnadevraya's best friend. (2017-2020)
Bhaskara Sharma a.k.a. Bhaskar: Ramakrishna and Sharda's son; Laxmi Amma's grandson; Amrapali's love interest, Kanta's childhood friend and evergreen crush. He is a lookalike of his father. When he returned from Gurukul after 20 years, he found that Vijayanagar had totally changed. The law and order had collapsed. Tathacharya told him that King Krishnadevraya along with Queens Chinnadevi and Tirumalamba renounced the Kingdom and went to the forest for exile for an unknown cause. Rama too went there in search of the King and the Queens, but he never returned. Bhaskar disguised as Rama and started helping Vijayanagar's people. He also exposed Kaikala. Later when Rama escaped from captivity and returned, Bhaskar was again sent to Gurukul. (2019-2020)
Pratyaksh Panwar as Child Bhaskar (Bhaskara Sharma): Rama and Sharda's son. He was sent to Gurukul. (2019)
Ayaan as Baby Bhaskar (Bhaskara Sharma): Rama and Sharda's son. (2018–2019)
Pankaj Berry as Tathacharya: The Royal Priest (Raj Guru) of Vijayanagar. Krishnadevraya's father figure guru; Varunmala's husband; Amrapali's foster father; Ananta Lakshmi's brother; Saudamini's love interest.  A cunning, opportunist, greedy and hypocritical priest. He is Rama's rival. He doesn't want Krishnadevraya to favour and applaud Rama and is always jealous of Rama's achievements. He always tries to confuse Rama and troubles Rama but Rama in turn solves the riddles and cases of the court. However, he loves Rama and does not want him to die. He later became a just and wise man. (2017-2020)
Manav Gohil as 
Maharaja Krishnadevaraya: A very powerful and great king of the Tuluva Dynasty of the Vijayanagara Empire. He is a just, courageous, wise and far-sighted king who loves his subjects immensely. Queen Chinnadevi and Queen Tirumalamba's husband; Achyutdevraya's elder brother; Rama's best friend. (2017-2019)
Tarun Khanna replaced Gohil: He came after 20 years of exile into the Vijayanagara Empire and was shocked by the problems faced by the people of the Vijayanagara Empire. He rebuilds the Golden Era of the Vijayanagara Empire after the reign of Sulakshana Devi and Balakumaran. (2020)
Hari Om: a woodcutter who is a lookalike of the king. The king called him to Vijayanagar to test his courtiers. (2017)
 Vishwajeet Pradhan as Mahamatya Kaikala: Maharaja Balakumar's maternal uncle; Pralayankar and Amrapali's father; Vijayanagar's Mahamatya(High Minister); Nakush's master. A sly, merciless, evil official. He came to run the kingdom of Vijayanagar after his nephew Balakumara was crowned king. He later revealed that he was the one who kidnapped and imprisoned Pandit Rama Krishna and Krishnadevraya for twenty years. He absolutely hates Rama and cannot kill him because the subjects treat Rama like their God. He has ambitions of ruling Vijayanagar after killing Balakumara. His trusted aide is Queen Sulakshana. He loves his daughter Amrapali and cannot do anything against her wishes. The entire kingdom is scared of him, even the courtiers and Maharaja Balakumara.

Recurring

 Sonia Sharma as Maharani Chinnadevi: Krishnadevraya's first wife. She was a royal dancer whom Krishnadevaraya marries. She was crowned as Vijaynagar's Senior Queen (बड़ी महारानी) when Krishnadev Raya was crowned as King. (2017–2019; 2020)
 Priyanka Singh as Maharani Tirumalamba: Krishnadevraya's second wife. She was the princess of Srirangapatana and later married to Krishnadev Raya before his coronation. She was crowned as the Junior Queen (छोटी महारानी) of Vijaynagar, when Krishnadev Raya was crowned as the King. (2017–2019; 2020)
 Priyamvada Kant as Sharada: Tenali's wife , Bhaskar's  mother; Lakshmi Amma's daughter-in-law; Anaive but kind-hearted lady. She is best friend of her Mother-in-law. Her catchphrase is "Uthalo" which means "Pick Up". Rama's wife; Bhaskar's mother; Govind's elder sister (2017–2018) 
 Niya Sharma replaced Kant as Sharada (2018–2019) 
 Aasiya Kazi replaced Sharma as Sharada (2019–2020)
 Nimisha Vakharia as Lakshmi Amma: Rama's mother; Sharda's mother-in-law; Bhaskar's grandmother. She had moved to her paternal house Tenali in Rama's childhood when his father, Lakshmi's husband died. After becoming a widow, she took an oath to not speak a single word for lifetime and she will just use sign language which can only be understood by Sharada. When Rama went to forest in search of the King, he hid Lakshmi Amma in a safe place. She returned to Vijaynagar after Rama's comeback. (2017–2019; 2020)
 Jiten Mukhi as Mahamantri Timmarasu: Krishnadevraya's Chief Minister and father figure; Rama's friend. He is an Honest, Loyal and Hardworking minister. He is one of the characters who knew about Tathacharya's greed and selfishness. He always supported Rama and helped him everytime. He is known as Heart of Vijayanagar. (2017–2019)
Sohit Soni as Manicharya (Mani): Tathacharya's Disciple and Dhanicharya's friend. He always insults Tathacharya along with Dhani. (2017–2020)
 Sanjay Mangnani as Dhanicharya (Dhani): Tathacharya's Disciple and Manicharya's friend. He always insults Tathacharya along with Mani. (2017–2020)
 Neetha Shetty as Maharani Sulakshana Devi: Balakumaran's wife, Swami's adopted mother. She was Kaikala's partner and was cunning like him. When Krishnadevaraya returned, She was exiled from Vijayanagar. (2019–2020)
 Shakti Anand as Maharaja Balakumaran: Sulakshana Devi's husband, Swami's adopted father, Tirumalamba's cousin brother, Kaikala's maternal nephew. He was made King by Tathacharya after Krishnadevaraya's exile. He was a foolish King who was exiled from Vijayanagar by his own wife and Kaikala. (2019–2020)
 Ajay Chaudhary as Mahamathya Pralayankar: Kaikala's son; Amrapali's brother; Charulata's husband. He was cunning just like his father but was unmasked by Rama and was claimed as a Traitor. (2020)
 Manul Chudasama as Princess Amrapali: Kaikala's daughter; Pralayankar's sister; Tathacharya's adopted daughter; Bhaskara's love interest. She went to forest for doing Tapasya to reduce her brother and father's sins. (2019–2020)
 Dhruvi Jani as Kanta: Bhaskar's childhood best friend. She always supported Bhaskar in all tough situations. (2019–2020)
 Mahi Soni as Child Kanta (2019)
 Aman Mishra as Gundappa: Rama's brother-like-friend. He left his parents in Tenali to become successful in life by living with Rama in Vijayanagar. Later, he helped Bhaskar against Kaikala and other enemies. (2019– 2020)
 Krish Parekh as Child Gundappa: Rama's friend. (2017–2019)
 Pradeep Kabra as Senapati Nakush: Kaikala's accomplice who was killed by Kaikala when he was trying to save himself. (2019–2020)
 Chahat Pandey as Ananta Lakshmi: Tathacharya's younger sister; Govind's love interest. (2018)
 Meghan Jadhav as Govind: Sharda's younger brother; Ananta Lakshmi's love interest. (2018)
 Jitendra Pathak as Nagar Kotwal. He was an accomplice of Tathacharya but later left his side. (2017–2019)
 Neha Chauhan as Varunmala: Tathacharya's wife. She is dedicated to her husband and she always thought him as a divine person who is blessed by the God. (2017–2019)
 Heer Chopra as Saudamini: Royal Dancer in Krishnadevraya's court; Tathacharya's love interest. (2017–2019; 2020)
 Deeksha Sonalkar as Mandakini: Royal Dancer (2020)
 Nishi Singh as Kotwalan Pushpavalli: Kotwal's wife and a plump woman. (2017–2018) (Replaced)
 Rishina Kandhari as Goddess Laxmi / Navadurga / Kaali / Saraswati (2018–2019; 2020)
 Cheshta Mehta as Charulata: Sulakshana Devi's sister; Pralyankar's wife. (2020)
 Ketan Karande as Bharkam: Sulakshana Devi's cousin (2020)

Cameo
 Barkha Sengupta as Goddess Kali
Krishna Bharadwaj as Sudama: A doppelganger of Rama who tried to kill Krishnadevraya but was later sent to prison. (2018)
 Amit Sinha as Mathuradas: A singer
 Rajesh Puri as Ramleela Trainer
 Anand Goradia as Bheeshan Babu (Ghungroo): Bahmani's assassin
 Rajesh Khera as Sultan Samsuddin Zafar Khan of Kalikutta.
 Debina Bonnerjee as Mohini
 Nirbhay Wadhwa as Wrestler Dhuaandhar Durjan
 Vikas Verma as The Portuguese magician Marques de Pompador
 Omkar Das Manikpuri as Aghori Baba Danyebanye (Futlubin Pimpin):Bahmani's commander and Ghungroo's elder brother. 
 Ajay Sharma as a Pirate Shambhuya
 Raja Chaudhary as Dimdima
 Mahesh Raja as Lakhanna
 Aliraza Namdar as Matrubhasha Gupt
 Abhishek Rawat as Kalluri Dinkar
 Raman Thukral as Child Tenali Rama
 Bikramjeet Kanwarpal as King Dhananjay Mudriya
 Amit Dolawat as Bala
 Reema Vohra as Charulata
 Minissha Lamba as Chandrakala: a Visha Kanya
 Monica Castelino as Kalavati
 Tarakesh Chauhan as Acharya Chakrapani
 Raju Pandit as King Dharmapala
 Madhura Naik as Queen Munmun
 Shahbaz Khan as Babur
 Rupali Bhosale as Maya, Mohini's sister
 Sooraj Thapar as Gajpati Pratap Rudra Dev: Orissa's King
 Haelyn Shastri as Varlaxmi: Friend / Neighbour of Sharda
 Urvashi S Sharma / Poonam Rajput as Princess Jaganmohini: Gajpati Pratap Rudra Dev's Daughter
 Piyali Munshi as Bhajani Devi / Sajani
 Ram Awana as Kaalbelu
 Deepak Qazir as Annacharya: Tathacharya's elder brother
 Bhavesh Balchandani / Amit Mistry as Birbal
 Bhupinder Singh as Shaitan
 Saud Mansuri as Yudhveer
 Aishwarya Raj Bhakuni as Sugandha: King Krishnadeva Raya's assumed sister Bhanumati's niece
 Athar Siddiqui as Chandrelu
 Mehmood Junior as Mullah Naseruddin
 Shoaib Ali as Prince of Tehran (Shahzada-e-Tehran) Kamaal-e-Mustafa
 Vijay Baldani as Siddhsen
 Ssumier S Pasricha as Sheikh Chilli
 Kajal Jain as Chitrangada (Lobh)
 Kapil Arya as Achutya
 Hridyansh Shekhawat as Somu / Krodh
 Heena Rajput as Timmarusu's wife
 Jahaan Arora as a Magician
 Patrali Chattopdhyay as Hanchhi, Chinese businesswoman
 Pratima Rasaily as Khashi, Chinese businesswoman
 Puneet Vashisht as Daku
 Rati Pandey as Princess Devyani
 Bhavin Bhanushali as Mirza Liyaqat Ali, Humayun's son
 Iqbal Azad as Humayun
 Manish Bishla as King Durjan
 Naveen Pandita as Akbar
 Satyajit Gaonkar as King of Him Dong
 Pradeep Gurang as the assistant of the King of Him Dong
 Nirisha Basnett as the advisor/secretary of the King of Him Dong
 Krutika Desai as Radha: fraud Devi Maa
 Sailesh Gulabani as Vengdu Swami: a magician with hypnotizing skills and Tathacharya's friend
 Vinay Rohrra as the storyteller Abdullah
 Visha Vira as the wife of Abdullah
Ahmad Harhash as Raj Pratap Singh he is the son of Kanta he the owner of the King of her husband (2017) (2020)

Production
Regarding the series Tenali Rama, Neeraj Vyas, Senior EVP & Head, Channel SAB and MAX cluster of channels, said, "India has a compelling tradition of both written and oral folklore. Our epics are treasures that teach life lessons via stories. Tenali Rama was a legendary poet of the 15th century. He is immortal, his wit being admired even in today's times. With Tenali Rama's adaptation on SAB, we intend to offer a restored and renewed version of this classic chronicle."

Casting
Krishna Bharadwaj was chosen to play the titular role of Tenali Rama and went bald for it. Speaking on how he got the role, he said, "I have been waiting for something good to come my way. When I received a call for Tenali Rama, I was shocked to be informed that I would have to go bald. But then I decided to give it a try, and it all fell into places. I feel there has been a divine force blessing me for I have managed to sink my teeth into the character so well. I did not do any research nor read about it but I can assure I am doing a good job, even though I do not consider myself so capable. As for the baldness, the first day, I was really upset but now I see Tenali in the mirror and not Krishna, and that takes away the blues."

It was reported in June 2017 that Manav Gohil had been cast to play the pivotal role of Krishnadevaraya. Gohil, who worked with SAB TV on Yam Hain Hum, where he played the titular role, said, "This time it's Krishnadevaraya, a very powerful king that I am portraying. It's a comedy show and I am looking forward to working with a new set of people. The show is "Tenali Rama" and I am so ready to get rolling with this one."

Veteran actor Pankaj Berry was cast to play the series' antagonist and Tenali Rama's foe frenemy, Tathacharya, who is the royal priest in the court of Emperor Krishnadevaraya, and always creates trouble for Tenali Rama with the help of his fellow disciples, Dhani and Mani.  Berry said, "I am very excited to play Tathacharya. It is a very different kind of challenging role, there are different layers to the character even though it's a negative character." It was reported in July 2017 that Sonia Sharma and Priyanka Singh had been cast to play the roles of Krishnadevaraya's wives, Chinna Devi and Tirumalamba, respectively.

Awards and nominations

Historical inaccuracies
 The series portrays Chinna Devi as Krishnadevaraya's senior wife and chief queen and Tirumalamba as his junior wife. This is inaccurate. Tirumalamba (also known as Tirumala Devi) was actually Krishnadevaraya's senior wife and his chief queen or patta manishi. She was the princess of Srirangapattana and Krishnadevaraya had married her most probably in 1498, long before his accession to the throne in 1509. Chinna Devi was actually a Royal Dancer to whom Krishnadevaraya had married immediately after birth of his first daughter in 1502.
 Krishnadevaraya died in 1529, when Birbal was just one year old. But, in the series, Birbal is portrayed as a young man in Krishnadevaraya's court.
 Krishnadevaraya's successor was his brother Achyuta Deva Raya not Balakumaran, Kaikala or Sulakshana Devi.
 The series showed that Krishnadevaraya had no children. In reality, he sired two daughters and one son (who died before becoming king) from his two wives.
 There are references to Goswami Tulsidas while Ramakrishna was visiting Babur in Agra, whereas Goswami Tulsidas lived during the period of Akbar and not Babur.
 Mullah Nasruddin lived from 1208-1285 CE while Ramakrishna and Krishnadevaraya lived in the sixteenth century.
 Saudamini and Ananta Lakshmi were probably Tathacharya's daughters, but in the series, Saudamini is shown as Tathacharya's girlfriend and Ananta Lakshmi is portrayed as his sister.
 Krishnadevaraya died in 1529 but the series showed that he returned after 20 years having undergone cosmetic surgery. R Ramakrishna too didn't return after 20 years and actually died in 1528.
 Kaikala whose full name was Shrisat Kaikala was Deputy Prime Minister. He was a contemporary of Tathacharya and Timmarusu and was also Rama's. He was a childhood friend of Tathacharya. He was respected by Krishnadevaraya and had an important position in Royal Court. He served as Defence Minister, Commander and between 1514-1515, he became Deputy Prime Minister. Later he and Tathacharya befriend Rama and Timmarusu. He died in 1540.
 Samshuddin Zafar Khan was not a Sultan. He was probably Vizier of Sultan of Bijapur, Ismail Adil Shah.

Reception
Shweta Keshri of India Today gave the series a positive review, praising Krishna Bharadwaj's portrayal of Tenali Rama, the VFX and special effects of the series, the colourful sets and comic content which "can easily lure viewers to the show and takes you back to the 16th century."

Broadcast

Tenali Rama was dubbed and aired in Tamil on Zee Tamil under the title, Tenali Raman.
It was dubbed and aired in Telugu on Zee Telugu as Vikata Kavi Thenali Ramakrishna.
The series was also dubbed in Malayalam and aired on Zee Keralam as Tennali Raman.
Tenali Rama was also dubbed in Kannada under the same title and was formerly aired on Dum TV Kannada (formerly called Dangal Kannada), but was soon taken off-air due to unknown reasons. The show is freshly dubbed and aired again on Siri Kannada, under the same title.

See also
 Tenali Ramakrishna
 The Adventures of Tenali Raman
 Tenali Ramakrishna (film)

References

External links
 
 Tenali Rama on SonyLIV

Sony SAB original programming
Indian comedy television series
Tenali Rama
2017 Indian television series debuts
Indian period television series
Television shows set in Karnataka
Mughal Empire in fiction
Indian historical television series
Television series set in the 16th century
Television shows set in Andhra Pradesh
Hindi-language television shows